Kiernan Jarryd Forbes  (28 January 1988 – 10 February 2023), known professionally as AKA, was a South African rapper, record producer and businessman. Born in Cape Town and raised in Johannesburg, Forbes gained recognition after releasing his single "Victory Lap" from his debut studio album, Altar Ego (2011). He was one of the most popular South African musicians of his era and the greatest selling South African hip hop artist of all-time.

Forbes continued his success by releasing studio albums which include Levels (2014), the collaborative album with Anatii, titled Be Careful What You Wish For (2017), Touch My Blood (2018) and his final album Mass Country (2023).

In April 2018, Forbes was featured as a special guest on WWE Live events, which were held in Johannesburg and Cape Town.

On 10 February 2023, Forbes was shot dead outside a restaurant in Durban.

Life and career

1988–2013: Early life, beginnings and Alter Ego 

Kiernan Jarryd Forbes was born in Cape Town, South Africa 28 January 1988 into a Christian family. He is the eldest of two boys he is the older brother of Steffan Forbes. He moved to Johannesburg at a young age and attended St John's College. In 2002, Forbes, alongside his two friends Vice Versa and Greyhound, formed a hip hop group called Entity. The group received a nomination for a KORA Award in the Best African Hip Hop category. Entity disbanded in 2006 and Forbes went on to study sound engineering. In 2006, Forbes co-founded the production collective The I.V League alongside two other members. The I.V League made production credits for several artists, including Khuli Chana, ProKid and JR. In 2009, he released three singles: "In My Walk", "I Do", and "Mistakes".

On 28 July 2010, Forbes released "I Want It All", which is the lead single from his debut studio album, Altar Ego. The album also pre-released two singles which were "All I Know" and "Victory Lap". "Victory Lap" was successful as it topped South African local radio charts. Alter Ego was then released on 23 August 2011. The album was certified gold by RiSA for its commercial success. The album won several accolades, including the 2011 Metro FM Awards for Best Hip Hop Album. Forbes won Best Male Artist of the Year at the 2012 South African Music Awards.

2014–2017: Levels and Be Careful What You Wish For 

Forbes released his second album, titled Levels, on 30 June 2014. The album was supported by four singles: "Jealousy", "Kontrol" (featuring Da L.E.S), "Congratulate" and "Run Jozi (Godly)" which features KO and Yanga. The album was certified platinum in 2014, and double platinum in 2018 by RiSA. This album gave Forbes the unique distinction of being the first South African rapper to go platinum with an album mainly recorded in English

On 2 December 2016, Forbes released the lead single "The World is Yours" from his third studio album. With the delay of its release, Forbes collaborated with associated act Anatii in composing the album, Be Careful What You Wish For. The album was released on 28 July 2017, with a positive response from critics. It was supported by three singles: "10 Fingers", "Don't Forget To Pray" and "Holy Mountain".

2018–2019: Touch My Blood 

With the pre-release of "The World is Yours" in 2016, Forbes also pre-released songs including "Caiphus Song", "Star Signs" (featuring Stogie T) and "Sweet Fire" in supporting the release of his third album, Touch My Blood. Concerning the album's front cover, Forbes took to Twitter to announce a contest for graphic designers to design the artwork for his album, using his clear face portrait. As numerous entries were sent, Forbes chose the winner named Taonga, who received an internship with Beam Group. Fifteen days before its release, he released the controversial single "Beyonce" which was a dismissive song dedicated to his past partner Bonang Matheba. 

Touch My Blood was then released on 15 June 2018 as it was set to release on 25 May 2018 but then delayed for taking time in building its promotion. The album was certified platinum then later certified double platinum by RiSA as for 2019. Touch My Bloods sixth single "Fela in Versace" featuring Kiddominant received higher commercial success compared to the other singles. The album features guest appearances from fellow South African artists including L-Tido, JR, Yanga Chief, Stogie T, Kwesta and Okmalumkoolkat, as well as Nigerian artist and producer Kiddominant.

On 8 April 2018, Forbes was featured on a WWE live event in Cape Town and Johannesburg, South Africa. In February 2019, he was the featured roastee in Comedy Central SA annual roast special.

In April 2020, Forbes alongside vodka brand Cruz launched a watermelon-flavoured drink with his initial on the bottles.

 2020–2022: Bhovamania, Mass Country 
On 6 November 2021, AKA's Extended Play Bhovamania was released. The EP was supported by four singles: "Energy", "Python", "Monuments" and "Cross My Heart". At the tenth ceremony of the South African Hip Hop Awards, he received a nomination for Artist of the Decade.

In early September 2022, AKA announced plans for his upcoming fourth studio album Mass Country on Instagram. The Nasty C-assisted track "Lemons [Lemonade]" was released on 16 September 2022, as the album's lead single. The song was certified Gold by the Recording Industry of South Africa (RiSA).

 Personal life 
Forbes began dating producer DJ Zinhle at the end of 2014. After receiving several South African Hip Hop Awards accolades, Zinhle hinted at their relationship by tweeting "Congratulations to my winner". The couple have a daughter named Kairo Owethu Forbes, born in 2015. In August 2015, Forbes and Zinhle split after it was revealed that Forbes allegedly cheated on Zinhle with television presenter Bonang Matheba. As Forbes and Matheba denied the allegations, they declared as they revealed their relationship in 2016. Forbes and Matheba broke up in December 2017. However, Forbes and Zinhle got back together in late 2018, although later in 2019 they broke up again.

On 21 February 2021, Forbes posted a picture on Instagram announcing his engagement to girlfriend Nelli Tembe. On 11 April 2021, Tembe died after a fall from a hotel in Cape Town.

Following the death of Tembe, reports emerged that Forbes had been on drugs. He issued a public statement in response saying he would not be drawn into exposing their troubles as a couple to defend himself against "one-sided views". The rapper's statement came in the wake of a News24 report, which claimed to have seen images where Forbes can be seen using his hands to violently break down a wooden door to enter the bedroom in their apartment in Bryanston, Johannesburg, where Tembe was hiding. The incident allegedly took place on 13 March 2021, almost a month before his death.

Death
On 10 February 2023, AKA was scheduled to perform at Yugo nightclub in Durban as part of his birthday celebrations. At around 10 P.M. that night, Forbes and his friends including Tebello Motsoane were standing outside Wish, a restaurant on Florida Road when a hooded gunman ran up to them and shot Forbes in the head, while his accomplice who was standing by Forbes's car released more shots which killed Motsoane.

The two gunmen then fled the scene on foot. Forbes and Motsoane were pronounced dead at the scene.

 Discography Studio albums Altar Ego (2011)
 Levels (2014)
 Touch My Blood (2018)
 MASS COUNTRY (2023)Collaborative albums Be Careful What You Wish For (with Anatii) (2017)Extended Plays'''
 247/365 E.P (2009)
 Bhovamania'' (2020)

Awards and nominations

See also
List of murdered hip hop musicians

References 

AKA
1988 births
2023 deaths
South African hip hop musicians
South African rappers
Cape Coloureds
Musicians from Cape Town
Deaths by firearm in South Africa